Hoërskool Stellenbosch is a public Afrikaans medium co-educational in the town of Stellenbosch, Western Cape, South Africa. It was founded in 1978 as a business-oriented technical school (Hoërhandelskool Stellenbosch), located in the center of town, but moved to the suburbs in the 1980s. It was reserved for white students during Apartheid, but was opened to all races in 1992.

Location

It is the second oldest European settlement in the province, after Cape Town. The town became known as the City of Oaks or Eikestad in Afrikaans and Dutch due to the large number of oak trees that were planted by its founder, Simon van der Stel, to grace the streets and homesteads.

The town is home to the University of Stellenbosch and other schools such as Paul Roos Gymnasium, Rhenish Girls' High School and Bloemhof High School. Stellenbosch High School is located between the JS Marais Park and the residential area Uniepark.

Meaning of school emblem
 The three castles from Simon van der Stel's family crest represents the stronghold that the school offers its learners.
 The acorn and oak leaf, both symbols of Stellenbosch, symbolise the growth of the learners in the school. It is in gold because their education is precious to them.
 The result of a learner's education is the certificate with which the school equip them for a bright future, which is why it is placed prominently in the middle.

The school anthem
The English version of the school anthem, which is not used any more, was written in April 1978 by JF Spies. HP van der Westhuizen put the lyrics to music in 1977.

The current school anthem is written in Afrikaans. The lyrics are as follows.

Stellenbos ń skone tuiste, en die luister van jou naam

Anker ons aan jou verlede, bind ons tot ń eenheid saam

Vier en hoog net soos die eike
groei ons hier op goeie grond

Met oog gelowig boëntoe
toegerus en afgerond

Semper Altior

Ons lese spoor ons teen die opdraand aan

Vastrap! Moedhou! Altyd hoër!

Tot ons op die bergspits staan

Academics
Learners from Stellenbosch High School write the NSC (National Senior Certificate) examination at the end of their matric year (grade 12).  Grade 8–9 learners have the following compulsory subjects:
 Arts and Culture  
 Economic and Management Sciences  
 English Home Language or English First Additional Language 
 Afrikaans Home Language 
 Life Orientation 
 Mathematics 
 Natural Sciences 
 Social Sciences 
 Technology

In grade 10 learners have four compulsory subjects:
 Afrikaans Home Language
 English Home Language or English First Additional Language
 Mathematics or Mathematical Literacy
 Life Orientation

Further more they can choose 3 or more of the following subjects:

Notable alumni
Nicole Holm (South African actress known for her role in the TV series Known Gods)<ref name = "Nicole">Nicole Holm, Noah of Cape Town Retrieved 7 June 2010</ref>
Pieter Schoeman (Leader of the London Philharmonic Orchestra)Pieter Schoeman, London Philharmonic Orchestra Retrieved 7 June 2010
Megan-Geoffrey Prins (winner of the Slurpie-Kanna award for best upcoming artist and a soloist in the University of Stellenbosch's symphony orchestra)Coertse, Prinsloo Among Kanna Award Recipients, The Herald Retrieved 7 June 2010
Anjulie de Vos (renowned South African cellist)Ensemblespelers wen eie CD, (in Afrikaans) Die Burger. 2 February 1998. Retrieved 7 June 2010
Stefan Temmingh (international Recorder player currently living in Germany)''

References

External links
School website
Western Cape Education Department profile

Educational institutions established in 1978
Schools in the Western Cape
Stellenbosch
1978 establishments in South Africa